Saint-Cyr-sur-Mer (literally Saint-Cyr on Sea; Occitan and Provençal: Sant Ceri) is a commune in the Var department in the Provence-Alpes-Côte d'Azur region in Southeastern France. In 2018, it had a population of 11,580. It neighbours La Ciotat to the west, Bandol to the east and La Cadière-d'Azur to the north.

In addition to the urban centre of Saint-Cyr itself, the commune includes the communities of Les Lecques, a port and beach resort, as well as La Madrague, a small port. The town square of Saint-Cyr contains a replica of the Statue of Liberty donated by Frédéric Bartholdi, sculptor of the original.

Population

Economy
Agriculture and tourism are important industries in the area. Fruit (especially olives), vegetables, as well as wine are produced in the commune. Both Saint-Cyr-sur-Mer and Les Lecques have urban markets. Tourist attractions include the sandy beach at Les Lecques, the coastal footpaths and the Musée de Tauroentum, a museum which displays artifacts from the Roman site of 'Tauroentum'.

Twin towns
Saint-Cyr-sur-Mer is twinned with:
 Città della Pieve, Italy
 Denzlingen, Germany

See also
 Communes of the Var department

References

External links
 Saint-Cyr tourist office
 Website of Saint-Cyr commune 

Communes of Var (department)
Populated coastal places in France